Ilyrgis is a genus of moths of the family Noctuidae first described by Francis Walker in 1859.

Description
The male has the second joint of palpi reaching vertex of head. Third joint moderate length and naked. Antennae bipectinate (comb like on both sides), with long branches. Thorax and abdomen smoothly scaled. Forewings with arched costa near base and at apex, which is slightly produced. The outer margin excurved at middle. Veins 7 to 10 stalked. A tuft of long scales from base of costa on underside. The retinacular tuft large. Hindwings with veins 3 and 4 stalked and vein 5 from lower angle of cell.

Species
Based on the Global Lepidoptera Names Index:
Ilyrgis capnosia Hampson, 1926
Ilyrgis costinotata Hampson, 1926
Ilyrgis echephurealis Walker, 1859
Ilyrgis ethiopica Hampson, 1926
Ilyrgis olivacea Rothschild, 1916
Ilyrgis perdiceas Schaus, 1916
Ilyrgis subsignata Mabille, 1900

References
Notes

Sources

Calpinae